Knivsflå is one of a handful of historic mountain farms on the steep mountainsides along the Geirangerfjorden. It is located in Stranda Municipality, Møre og Romsdal county, Norway. Actually it was two farms sharing the location, and they have been inhabited since at least the 1600s. It is reachable by a hardly visible footpath, starting from Knivsflå. The Knivsflå farm was abandoned in 1898 due to the danger of falling rocks. The farm is located to the north of the Seven Sisters waterfall, and directly across the fjord from the old Skageflå farm.

One can reach Knivsflå from the nearby village of Geiranger with help of the sight seeing boat (M/S Geirangerfjord) that will take one to a spot below the farm, the walk up then takes 30–60 minutes. Also, Coastal Odyssey, a sea kayaking company in Geiranger, runs guided kayaking trips to the farm with interpretation. Active Geiranger also does guided kayak trips to the farm as well as a water taxi that can take you to the trail.

The name
The first element is the genitive of kniv ('knife'), the last element is flå ('field in a mountain side'). The farm is named after a sharp mountain edge with the name Kniven ('the knife').

References

Historic farms in Norway
Farms in Møre og Romsdal
Stranda
Tourist attractions in Møre og Romsdal
Former populated places in Møre og Romsdal